Callionymus acutirostris, the pointed dragonet, is a species of dragonet native to the Pacific Ocean around the Philippines. It is a demersal fish found at an ocean depth of 64-81m.

References 

A
Fish described in 1981
Taxa named by Ronald Fricke